West Sumba Regency is a regency in East Nusa Tenggara Province of Indonesia. Established in 1958,
the regency was considerably reduced in 2007 with the creation of new Regencies on Sumba Island.  Its area is now 737.42 km2, and its population was 111,993 at the 2010 census and 145,097 at the 2020 Census. It has its seat (capital) in (Kota) Waikabubak.

The region is rather dry.  One of the main problems for people living in rural areas in the province is frequent shortages of water. Although there are some local supplies of water from wells and springs, water from these sources often becomes scarce during the long dry seasons.  In some villages local non-government organisations, some supported with international assistance, support small projects to improve village water supplies.

Administrative Districts 

The West Sumba Regency (following the re-organisation in 2007 which created Southwest Sumba Regency and Central Sumba Regency out of parts of West Sumba Regency) is now composed of six districts (kecamatan), whose areas (in km2) and populations at the 2010 Census  and 2020 Census are listed below. The table also includes the location of the district headquarters, the number of administrative villages (rural desa and urban kelurahan) in each district, and its postal code.

Villages
Villages in the area include:
Tarung 
Waitabar 
Bodo Ede 
Bodomaroto

Tourism
In 2016 and 2017 Travel + Leisure magazine gave the title of World's Best Hotel (with the highest 98.35 score based on readers' choice) to Nihiwatu Resort (now known as Nihi Sumba). The hotel is one of the leading sectors for ecotourism.

Climate
Waikabubak has a tropical monsoon climate (Am) with moderate to little rainfall from June to September and heavy to very heavy rainfall from October to May.

References

External links

 sumbabaratkab.go.id

Regencies of East Nusa Tenggara
Sumba
1958 establishments in Indonesia